Aulonocara trematocephalum is a species of haplochromine cichlid. It is endemic to Lake Malawi. It is only known from the holotype which was erroneously recorded as being collected from the "north end of Lake Tanganyika" and described as Tilapia trematocephala nd that it belonged to one of  the Malawi cichlid groups and was initially included in the genus Trematocranus

References

Fish of Malawi
trematocephala
Fish described in 1901
Taxonomy articles created by Polbot
Fish of Lake Malawi